XHTAM may refer to:

 XHTAM-FM 96.1 Ciudad Victoria, Tamaulipas, a simulcast of XETAM-AM 640
 XHTAM-TDT 17 Reynosa-Matamoros, Tamaulipas, an affiliate of Canal de las Estrellas network